The Right – Party for Referendum, Sovereignty and Homeland Protection is a far-right political party in Germany.

History
The party was founded in 2012 by the neo-Nazi Christian Worch, along with many members of the German People's Union (DVU) in protest against the merger of their party into the National Democratic Party (NPD). In May 2012 circles of the dissolved DVU announced the establishment of a new party in competition with the NPD was planned. In June 2012, articles of association and the party program were forwarded to the Federal Returning Officer for examination. On 13 October 2012 the second federal convention of The Right took place in Ludwigshafen on the Rhine.

In January 2013, the Public Prosecutor's Office in Dortmund concluded that the founding of the North Rhine-Westphalian State Association was insufficient reason for a preliminary investigation. It examined a violation in August 2012 of the prohibition of association for the National Resistance Dortmund ( Nationaler Widerstand Dortmund, NWDO). The "hard core" of the NWDO (Dennis Giemsch, Michael Brück and Siegfried Borchardt) had created a party on 15 September 2012.

On 5 July 2014, the 5th Federal Party Congress took place in Hamm (NRW), where Christian Worch was once again elected Federal Chairman. Ingeborg Lobocki resigned as Deputy Chairman and Treasurer for health reasons, replaced by Tatjana Berner.

On 13 January 2016, it was announced that the party's websites were deleted from the Facebook social network for violations of the company's Terms of Service. 

On 28 October 2017, Worch was confirmed as chairman at the federal party convention with 78.4% of the votes. Subsequently, however, the Thuringian State Association demanded that the federal party should decide "that the party is fully committed to the rights of the German national community." Worch held a counter-speech and rejected the request for legal and political reasons. The majority of the members followed the Thuringian state association and not Worch. Worch then resigned  and left the party. 

Dutch Neo-Nazi and Hitler lookalike Stefan Wijkamp was a former board member for the party. 

Worch's successor was the multiply convicted Dortmund neo-Nazi squad Christoph Drewer. On 1 April 2018, Bruck and Sascha Krolzig were elected as federal co-chairmen at a federal party conference; At the same time, the party added in its name the wording "Party for Referendum, Sovereignty and Homeland Protection".

For the European elections in 2019, The Right has chosen the imprisoned, repeatedly sentenced 90-year-old Holocaust denier Ursula Haverbeck as its top candidate.

Election results

Federal Parliament (Bundestag)

European Parliament

References

2012 establishments in Germany
Eurosceptic parties in Germany
Far-right political parties in Germany
Fascist parties in Germany
German nationalist political parties
Nationalist parties in Germany
Neo-Nazi political parties in Europe
Neo-Nazism in Germany
Political parties established in 2012
Anti-immigration politics in Germany